Clausirion comptum is a species of longhorn beetle in the Elaphidiini subfamily. It was described by Martins and Napp in 1984. It is endemic to Mato Grosso, Brazil where it flies from August to September.

References

Elaphidiini
Beetles described in 1984
Endemic fauna of Brazil